Éric Le Hung (born 29 September 1937 in Haiphong) is a Vietnamese-French film director.

His works include Moi, fleur bleue.

References

External links 

Living people
1937 births
People from Haiphong
French screenwriters
French film directors
French people of Vietnamese descent